Ahmed Asfandyar (born 16 November 1996) is a Pakistani cricketer. He made his first-class debut for Federally Administered Tribal Areas in the 2016–17 Quaid-e-Azam Trophy on 1 October 2016.

References

External links
 

1996 births
Living people
Pakistani cricketers
Federally Administered Tribal Areas cricketers
Place of birth missing (living people)